Anabela Fernanda Pinto Silva (born 26 December 1970), known as Bé, is a Portuguese former footballer who played as a defender. She has been a member of the Portugal women's national team.

International goals
Scores and results list Portugal's goal tally first

References

1970 births
Living people
Portuguese women's footballers
Women's association football defenders
Portugal women's international footballers